Josser on the Farm  is a 1934 British comedy film directed by T. Hayes Hunter and starring Ernie Lotinga, Betty Astell and Garry Marsh. It was part of the series of Josser films featuring Lotinga.

Cast
 Ernie Lotinga - Jimmy Josser
 Betty Astell - Betty
 Garry Marsh - Granby
 Muriel Aked - Mrs Savage
 Wilfrid Hyde-White - Brooks
 John Gattrell - Dennis
 Hope Davy - June
 Edwin Ellis - Spud
 H. F. Maltby - Luke

References

Bibliography
 Sutton, David R. A chorus of raspberries: British film comedy 1929-1939. University of Exeter Press, 2000.

External links

1934 films
1934 comedy films
British comedy films
Films directed by T. Hayes Hunter
British black-and-white films
1930s English-language films
1930s British films